Lecanora viridipruinosa is a species of crustose lichen in the family Lecanoraceae. Found in Alaska, it was formally described as a new species by lichenologists Måns Svensson and Toby Spribille. The type specimen was collected from the Hoonah-Angoon Census Area in Glacier Bay National Park. The specific epithet viridipruinosa refers to the greenish pruina on the discs of the apothecia. The lichen is only known to occur in the type locality.

See also
List of Lecanora species

References

viridipruinosa
Lichen species
Lichens described in 2020
Lichens of Subarctic America
Taxa named by Toby Spribille
Fungi without expected TNC conservation status